Abdiwali Abdirahman Mohamed (born 1 January 2000) is a Somali footballer who plays as a defender for Mogadishu City Club.

Club career
Abdirahman Mohamed made two appearances for Mogadishu City Club in the 2020–21 CAF Champions League.

International career
On 3 August 2019, Abdirahman Mohamed made his debut for Somalia in a 4–1 loss against Uganda during the 2020 African Nations Championship qualification.

References

2000 births
Living people
Association football defenders
Somalian footballers
Somalia international footballers